Quercus langbianensis is an uncommon oak tree species in the family Fagaceae. It is placed in subgenus Cerris, section Cyclobalanopsis, the ring-cupped oaks. These differ from other Quercus groups in that they have acorns with distinctive cups: usually with substantial rings, made-up of scales that have grown together. This species can be found in sub-tropical and tropical seasonal forests of Cambodia, China (mostly Yunnan) and Vietnam.

Description
Quercus langbianensis is an evergreen tree that reaches a height of up to 15 m. The bark is rough, with spots. The branches are brown and tomentose when young, less hairy with age.

The leaves measure 70-140 (up to 170) x 25–40 mm, elliptical-lanceolate to oblanceolate, leathery and glabrous on both sides, with margins having numerous small teeth that are obtuse, wavy near the apex: which is acuminate to slightly  caudate; petioles are 15–20 mm and hairless.

The acorns are sub-globose approximately 17–20 mm, covered with fine silky hair (sericeous), pale brown and ripening by September; scars are approximately 10 mm in diameter and convex. Their styles are persistent about 2 mm in diameter.  Superficially, the cups are bowl-shaped, 8 x 20–25 mm approximately, enclosing 1/2 or 2/3 of the acorn.  Outside and inside the reddish, tomentose acorn has a wall about 3 mm thick. The bracts are formed by 5 to 7 rings, with whole margins.

References

External links
 
 Line drawings, Flora of China Illustrations vol. 4, fig. 378, drawing 5-11 at lower left
 

langbianensis
Trees of Cambodia
Trees of Vietnam
Flora of Indo-China
Plants described in 1921
Taxa named by Aimée Antoinette Camus